This is a list of 136 species in Lepidostoma, a genus of bizarre caddisflies in the family Lepidostomatidae.

Lepidostoma species

 Lepidostoma acarolum Denning, 1962 i c g
 Lepidostoma americanum (Banks, 1897) i c g
 Lepidostoma anorhepes (Neboiss, 1990) i c g
 Lepidostoma apornum Denning, 1949 i c g
 Lepidostoma astaneum Denning, 1954 i c g
 Lepidostoma aztecum Flint & Bueno-Soria, 1977 i c g
 Lepidostoma bakeri Flint, 1965 i c g
 Lepidostoma basale (Kolenati, 1848) g
 Lepidostoma baxea Denning, 1958 i c g
 Lepidostoma bisculum Weaver & Huisman, 1992 i c g
 Lepidostoma bryanti (Banks, 1908) i c g
 Lepidostoma canthum Ross, 1941 i c g
 Lepidostoma carolina (Banks, 1911) i c g
 Lepidostoma carrolli Flint, 1958 i c g
 Lepidostoma cascadense (Milne, 1936) i c g b
 Lepidostoma castalianum Weaver & Myers, 1998 i c g
 Lepidostoma ceratinum Weaver & Andersen, 1995 i c g
 Lepidostoma chiriquiensis Holzenthal & Strand, 1992 i c g
 Lepidostoma cinereum (Banks, 1899) i c g b
 Lepidostoma compressum Etnier & Way, 1973 i c g
 Lepidostoma conjunctum (Banks, 1934) i c g
 Lepidostoma coreanum Kumanski & Weaver, 1992 g
 Lepidostoma corollatum Weaver & Huisman, 1992 i c g
 Lepidostoma costale (Banks, 1914) i c g
 Lepidostoma cratis Weaver & Huisman, 1992 i c g
 Lepidostoma curtipendulum Weaver & Huisman, 1992 i c g
 Lepidostoma dafila Bueno-Soria & Contreras-Ramos, 1986 i c g
 Lepidostoma deceptivum (Banks, 1907) i c g
 Lepidostoma delongi Ross, 1946 i c g
 Lepidostoma denningi Weaver, 1988 i c g
 Lepidostoma dulitense (Mosely, 1951) i c g
 Lepidostoma ectopium Holzenthal & Strand, 1992 i c g
 Lepidostoma erectum Weaver & Huisman, 1992 i c g
 Lepidostoma ermanae Weaver, 1988 i c g
 Lepidostoma errigenum Denning, 1954 i c g
 Lepidostoma etnieri Weaver, 1988 i c g
 Lepidostoma excavatum Flint & Wiggins, 1961 i c g
 Lepidostoma ferox Branch g
 Lepidostoma fimbriatum (Pictet, 1865) i c g
 Lepidostoma flinti Wallace & Sherberger, 1972 i c g
 Lepidostoma fraternum Mey, 1998 i c g
 Lepidostoma frontale (Banks, 1901) i c g
 Lepidostoma frosti (Milne, 1936) i c g
 Lepidostoma ganesa Malicky & Chantaramongkol, 1994 i c g
 Lepidostoma gigitaring Weaver & Huisman, 1992 i c g
 Lepidostoma glenni Wallace & Sherberger, 1972 i c g
 Lepidostoma grande (Banks, 1931) i c g
 Lepidostoma griseum (Banks, 1911) i c g
 Lepidostoma hamatum Weaver & Andersen, 1995 i c g
 Lepidostoma hattorii  g
 Lepidostoma heveli Flint & Bueno-Soria, 1977 i c g
 Lepidostoma hirtum (Fabricius, 1775) i c g
 Lepidostoma hoodi Ross, 1948 i c g b
 Lepidostoma ishigakiense  g
 Lepidostoma jewetti Ross, 1946 i c g b
 Lepidostoma knulli Ross, 1946 i c g
 Lepidostoma kornmanni Radovanovic, 1932 i c g
 Lepidostoma lacinatum Flint, 1967 i c g
 Lepidostoma latipenne (Banks, 1905) i c g
 Lepidostoma leonilae Bueno-Soria & Contreras-Ramos, 1986 i c g
 Lepidostoma lescheni Bowles, Mathis, & Weaver, 1994 i c g
 Lepidostoma libum Ross, 1941 i c g
 Lepidostoma licolum Denning, 1975 i c g
 Lepidostoma lidderwatense  g
 Lepidostoma lobatum Wallace & Sherberger, 1972 i c g
 Lepidostoma lotor Ross, 1946 i c g
 Lepidostoma lydia Ross, 1939 i c g
 Lepidostoma macroceron Weaver & Andersen, 1995 i c g
 Lepidostoma medium (Banks, 1934) i c g
 Lepidostoma memotong Weaver & Huisman, 1992 i c g
 Lepidostoma mexicanum (Banks, 1901) i c g
 Lepidostoma mitchelli Flint & Wiggins, 1961 i c g
 Lepidostoma modestum (Banks, 1905) i c g
 Lepidostoma montatan Malicky & Chantaramongkol, 1994 i c g
 Lepidostoma morsei Weaver, 1988 i c g
 Lepidostoma nayarkot Malicky & Chantaramongkol, 1994 i c g
 Lepidostoma neboissi Weaver & Huisman, 1992 i c g
 Lepidostoma niigataense  g
 Lepidostoma oaxacense Bueno-Soria & Contreras-Ramos, 1986 i c g
 Lepidostoma octolobium Weaver & Huisman, 1992 i c g
 Lepidostoma ojanum Weaver & Myers, 1998 i c g
 Lepidostoma ontario Ross, 1941 i c g
 Lepidostoma oreion Weaver & Huisman, 1992 i c g
 Lepidostoma ormeum Ross, 1946 i c g
 Lepidostoma ozarkense Flint & Harp, 1990 i c g
 Lepidostoma palawanensis Malicky & Chantaramongkol, 1994 i c g
 Lepidostoma pedang Weaver & Huisman, 1992 i c g
 Lepidostoma pendulum Weaver & Huisman, 1992 i c g
 Lepidostoma pictile (Banks, 1899) i c g
 Lepidostoma pilosum Navás, 1928 i c g
 Lepidostoma pluviale (Milne, 1936) i c g
 Lepidostoma podagrum (McLachlan, 1871) i c g
 Lepidostoma polylepidum Holzenthal & Strand, 1992 i c g
 Lepidostoma prominens (Banks, 1930) i c g
 Lepidostoma pseudabruptum Malicky & Chantaramongkol, 1994 i c g
 Lepidostoma quaternarium Weaver & Huisman, 1992 i c g
 Lepidostoma quercinum Ross, 1938 i c g
 Lepidostoma quila Bueno-Soria & Padilla-Ramirez, 1981 i c g
 Lepidostoma ratanapruksi Malicky & Chantaramongkol, 1994 i c g
 Lepidostoma rayneri Ross, 1941 i c g
 Lepidostoma recinum Denning, 1954 i c g
 Lepidostoma rectangulare Flint, 1967 i c g
 Lepidostoma reimoseri Flint & Bueno-Soria, 1977 i c g
 Lepidostoma reosum Denning, 1954 i c g b
 Lepidostoma roafi (Milne, 1936) i c g
 Lepidostoma sackeni (Banks, 1936) i c g
 Lepidostoma sainii  g
 Lepidostoma schwendingeri Malicky & Chantaramongkol, 1994 i c g
 Lepidostoma serratum Flint & Wiggins, 1961 i c g
 Lepidostoma sibuyana Malicky & Chantaramongkol, 1994 i c g
 Lepidostoma simalungensis Malicky & Chantaramongkol, 1994 i c g
 Lepidostoma sommermanae Ross, 1946 i c g b
 Lepidostoma spicatum Denning, 1954 i c g
 Lepidostoma steinhauseri Flint & Bueno-Soria, 1977 i c g
 Lepidostoma stigma Banks, 1907 i c g
 Lepidostoma stylifer Flint & Wiggins, 1961 i c g
 Lepidostoma talamancense Flint & Bueno-Soria, 1977 i c g
 Lepidostoma tapanti Holzenthal & Strand, 1992 i c g
 Lepidostoma taurocorne Yang & Weaver, 2002 g
 Lepidostoma tectore (Neboiss, 1991) i c g
 Lepidostoma tenellum Weaver & Huisman, 1992 i c g
 Lepidostoma tenerifensis Malicky, 1992 i c g
 Lepidostoma tibiale (Carpenter, 1933) i c g
 Lepidostoma togatum (Hagen, 1861) i c g b
 Lepidostoma trilobatum  g
 Lepidostoma uncinatum Weaver & Huisman, 1992 i c g
 Lepidostoma unicolor (Banks, 1911) i c g
 Lepidostoma varithi Malicky & Chantaramongkol, 1994 i c g
 Lepidostoma vernale (Banks, 1897) i c g b
 Lepidostoma verodum Ross, 1948 i c g
 Lepidostoma weaveri Harris, 1986 i c g
 Lepidostoma wliense Weaver & Andersen, 1995 i c g
 Lepidostoma xolotl Holzenthal & Strand, 1992 i c g
 Lepidostoma xylochos (Neboiss, 1991) i c g
 Lepidostoma yuwanense  g
 Lepidostoma zimmermanni Malicky & Chantaramongkol, 1994 i c g

Data sources: i = ITIS, c = Catalogue of Life, g = GBIF, b = Bugguide.net

References

Lepidostoma 
Articles created by Qbugbot